Alenka Bikar (born 7 January 1974) is a retired female sprinter from Slovenia, born in Ljubljana. She specialised in the 200 metres, competing in three Olympic games from 1996 to 2004. She was also named Slovenian Sportswoman of the Year in 2001. Bikar won the gold medal in the 200 m in the Mediterranean Games in 2005.

On 19 April 2012, Bikar replaced Zoran Janković as a deputy of the Positive Slovenia party in the National Assembly of Slovenia.

Competition record

Personal bests
 100 metres – 11.21s (2001)
 200 metres – 22.76s (2001)

References

External links
 
 

1974 births
Living people
Sportspeople from Ljubljana
Slovenian female sprinters
Athletes (track and field) at the 1996 Summer Olympics
Athletes (track and field) at the 2000 Summer Olympics
Athletes (track and field) at the 2004 Summer Olympics
Olympic athletes of Slovenia
Members of the National Assembly (Slovenia)
Positive Slovenia politicians
Slovenian sportsperson-politicians
Mediterranean Games gold medalists for Slovenia
Mediterranean Games bronze medalists for Slovenia
Mediterranean Games medalists in athletics
Athletes (track and field) at the 1997 Mediterranean Games
Athletes (track and field) at the 2005 Mediterranean Games
Competitors at the 2001 Goodwill Games
Olympic female sprinters